Hella Ranner (born 10 March 1951 in Graz, Austria) was a Member of the European Parliament (MEP) from 2009 to 2011, representing the Austrian People's Party and the European People's Party Group.

References

1951 births
Living people
Austrian People's Party MEPs
MEPs for Austria 2009–2014
Politicians from Graz
University of Graz alumni